Abboud Qanbar(), also known as Abu Haidar, is an Iraqi General. On January 13, 2007, he was appointed by Prime Minister Nouri Maliki as the Iraqi commander for the Baghdad Operations Command, which controlled all Iraqi security forces in Baghdad (sans Iraqi Special Operations Forces) and was charged with securing the capital. His Chief of Staff is Major General Hassan, and his Chief of Plans is Staff Colonel Abd Alamir. He hails from Amarah, a city in Southern Iraq.

Qanbar was a commander in the navy during Saddam Hussein's reign, and took part in the Iran–Iraq War of 1980–88, and the war over Kuwait in 1990-91. In the latter, he commanded a garrison on the Kuwaiti island of Failaka, and was taken prisoner by U.S. Marines. He was a brigadier general in the navy during the 1991 Gulf War. After being captured in Failaka, he was briefly transferred to Saudi Arabia before his release. Despite being captured by American forces, Qanbar was later decorated by Saddam for his bravery in defense of the island. After the war, Qanbar was posted in Basra, but was excluded from new commands after he refused to stop the 1991 Shiite uprising.

He was appointed by Iraqi Prime Minister Nouri al-Maliki to lead the 2007 Baghdad crackdown in February 2007, though he was considered a relatively unknown officer. Qanbar was a compromise choice after the U.S. military rejected Maliki's first choice, Mohan al-Freiji. Qanbar announced the details of the new security plan on live Iraqi television on February 13.

References

Military leaders of the Gulf War
Living people
Iraqi Shia Muslims
Iraqi generals
1945 births
People from Amarah